HSV Borussia Friedenstal, or Herforder SV, is a German sports club based in Friedenstal, a suburb of Herford, North Rhine-Westphalia. The club was founded in 1953 and the women's team was established in 1969. Friedenstal greatest success was the qualification for the Bundesliga in 2008–09. After being relegated in its first Bundesliga season, the club again got promoted to the Bundesliga in 2009–10 but now plays in the 2. Bundesliga again.

History
Borussia Friedenstal was founded in 1953. After a friendly game in 1969 the women's department was established under the lead of Fritz Böke and Doris Henschel. Four years later Friedenstal began participating in official games. 1975 Friedenstal achieved promotion to the Bezirksliga and three years later another promotion brought the club to Germany's top-tier football league, the Landesliga. In 1980 Borussia lost in the final of the Westfalencup only on penalties to TSV Siegen, a club to become one of Germany's most successful women's teams. Friedenstal also qualified for the Verbandsliga at its inception in 1981 and for the Regionalliga at its inception in 1985.

After withdrawing their team from the Regionalliga Friedenstal got promoted to the Regionalliga again in 1993. An intermezzo in the Verbandsliga in 1995–96 ended without a loss and yet another promotion to the Regionalliga for Friedenstal. The club won the Westfalenpokal in 2000 and 2001, thereby qualifying for the DFB Pokal and on both occasions reaching the round of 16 in the cup.

At the inception of the 2. Bundesliga in 2004 Friedenstal failed to qualify, but managed promotion as champion of the Regionalliga West in 2006. After just two years in the 2. Bundesliga the club's greatest success came in form of the promotion to Germany's premier football league, the Bundesliga where Friedenstal faced immediate relegation, though. In 2009–10 Friedenstal won 2. Bundesliga again, this time without a loss and setting a new record and plays in the 1. Bundesliga again in 2010–11.

Current squad

Former players
  Kylla Sjoman
  Laura Feiersinger

Statistics

References

External links
 Official site of HSV Borussia Friedenstal
 Fußball-Bundesliga at DFB

Women's football clubs in Germany
Football clubs in North Rhine-Westphalia
Association football clubs established in 1953
Herford (district)
1953 establishments in West Germany
Frauen-Bundesliga clubs